The Glinka World Soil Prize is an annual prize awarded since 2016 to researchers for their direct contributions to the preservation of the environment, food security and poverty alleviation. The winner receives a USD 15000 check and a Glinka gold-plated medal.

The prize is named in honour of the Russian soil scientist Konstantin Glinka (1867-1927). It is awarded by the Global Soil Partnership of the United Nations Food and Agriculture Organization.

See also

 List of environmental awards

References

External links
 

Awards established in 2016
Environmental awards
Food and Agriculture Organization
Humanitarian and service awards